Abt or ABT may refer to:

 Abt (surname)
 Al-Baha Domestic Airport, Al Baha, Saudi Arabia
 Abt rack system, Swiss rack systems for hauling trains up steep inclines
 9423 Abt, a main-belt asteroid
 Abelam language, a Sepik language of Papua New Guinea
 Analytical base table, a database table used for data analytics
 Availability-based tariff for electrical power in India
 Automatic ball trap, in clay pigeon shooting

Organizations 

 ABT (TV station), Hobart, Tasmania
 Abt Sportsline, German motor racing company
 Abt Electronics, US retailer
 Abbott Laboratories, NYSE symbol
 American Ballet Theatre, New York City, US
 Ansarullah Bengali Team, an Islamic extremist organization in Bangladesh
 Aryan Brotherhood of Texas, a white supremacist prison gang
 Association of Building Technicians, a former British trade union
Autoridad de Fiscalización y Control Social de Bosques y Tierras (ABT), the Forest and Land Inspection and Social Control Authority, a Bolivian government agency

See also 
 Abts, a surname